was an organization formed by the Empire of Japan in the occupied Dutch East Indies (present-day Indonesia) during World War II. Indonesian names for the organization were Barisan Pembantu Polisi ("Auxiliary police") and Laskar Penjaga Keamanan rakyat ("People's defense force"). The Keibōdan was formed on 29 April 1943, alongside the Seinendan, and led by the occupation authorities. The purpose of the Keibōdan was to assist the Japanese-controlled police for the duration of the occupation. In addition, the organization ostensibly provided paramilitary training to Indonesian youths to defend their homeland from imperialism. In reality, the Japanese intended the Keibōdan to be a reserve of troops during its war against the Allies. In Sumatra the organization was known as Bōgodan (防護団, "Defense corps"), while in Kalimantan it was better known as Sameo Konen Hokokudan. Among Chinese Indonesians formed a variation of Keibōdan with the name Kakyō Keibōtai (華僑警防隊; "Overseas Chinese defense corps"). In charge of the Keibōdan were the Keimubu ("Police subdepartment"), who in turn reported to the Gunseibu ("Military administration"). The Keibōdan groups consisted of youths aged 20 to 35 years and numbered approximately one million members. Serving as an auxiliary police force, it was authorized to regulate traffic and maintain order and security in the villages.

See also
 Collaboration with the Axis powers
 Japanese occupation of the Dutch East Indies
 Seinendan

References

Indonesian collaborators with Imperial Japan
Japanese occupation of the Dutch East Indies
Military units and formations of Imperial Japan